Omoglymmius brendelli is a species of beetle in the subfamily Rhysodinae. It was described by R.T. Bell & J.R. Bell in 1988. It is known from  the central part of Sulawesi (Indonesia), near the Gulf of Tolo. The specific name brendelli honors M. J. D. Brendell, collector of the holotype.

Omoglymmius brendelli holotype, a female, measures  in length and was obtained from a rotten log.

Notes

References

brendelli
Beetles of Indonesia
Endemic fauna of Indonesia
Fauna of Sulawesi
Beetles described in 1988